Vittorio Amandola (4 November 1952 – 22 July 2010) was an Italian actor and voice actor.

Biography
Born in Perugia, Amandola began his career in the theatre world in the 1970s and found great success starring in various plays and later went on to direct his own theatre productions. He also starred in several Italian films and television shows. In 2006, he made notable cameos in RIS Delitti Imperfetti and Don Matteo.

Amandola was also known as a voice actor. He voiced Waylon Smithers in the Italian-Language version of The Simpsons until his death in 2010 and he even dubbed many Disney characters into the Italian language, particularly during the Disney Renaissance period. One of these roles included Lumière from Beauty and the Beast. From 1989 to 2000, he was the Italian voice of Goofy as well as Yosemite Sam in Looney Tunes from 1996 to 2006.

Personal life
Amandola was married to voice actress Sonia Scotti. He was also the stepfather to her two children.

Death
Amandola died of cancer in Rome on 22 July 2010 nearly three months before his 58th birthday. The Italian voices of Smithers and Yosemite Sam were passed on to Pasquale Anselmo and Pierluigi Astore respectively.

Filmography

Cinema

Belli e brutti ridono tutti (1979)
Ginger and Fred (1986)
Farewell Moscow (1987)
Il volpone (1988) - Serse Tessari
Appointment in Liverpool (1988) - Commissario
Queen of Hearts (1989) - Barbariccia
Time to Kill (1989)
Panama Sugar (1990) - Fox Perry
Who Wants to Kill Sara? (1992) - Avv. Della Sig.ra Toscano
Il branco (1994) - Il padre
The Monster (1994) - Antique dealer
Strangled Lives (1996) - Antiquario
La freccia azzurra (1996) - Capitano Mezza Barba (voice)
Acquario (1996)
Farfalle (1997)
Dio c'è (1998)
Il guerriero Camillo (1999)
 (2000, TV Movie) - Simone il fariseo
Il prezzo (2000)
Involtini primavera (2000) - Italo
The Last Kiss (2001) - Zio Mimmo
Witches to the North (2001) - Baffone
Ciao America (2002) - Prof. Angelini
Gioco con la morte (2002) - Alvise
La rivincita (2002) - Marco
Tartarughe sul dorso (2004) - Baker
Baciami piccina (2006) - Attanasio
Napoleon and Me (2006) - Sindaco Egisto Lonzi Tognarini
Bentornato Pinocchio (2007) - Omino di Burro (voice)

Dubbing roles

Animation
Waylon Smithers in The Simpsons (seasons 1-20)
Waylon Smithers in The Simpsons Movie
Goofy in All Disney Productions (1989-2000)
Yosemite Sam in Looney Tunes (1996-2006)
Lumière in Beauty and the Beast
Lumière in Beauty and the Beast: The Enchanted Christmas
Lumière in Belle's Magical World
Chef Louis in The Little Mermaid
Chef Louis in The Little Mermaid II: Return to the Sea
Molt in A Bug's Life
Stinky Pete the Prospector in Toy Story 2
Old Louie in Oliver & Company
General Rogard in The Iron Giant
Negaduck and Tuskernini in Darkwing Duck
Horace in Family Guy (seasons 2-7)
Professor Norton Nimnul in Chip 'n Dale: Rescue Rangers

Live action
Thomas Murphy in Alien 3
Paul Momund in Hannibal Rising
Agent Johnson in Die Hard
Candidate Welles in Postal
Alexander Falko in Mouse Hunt
Farmer Maggot in The Lord of the Rings: The Fellowship of the Ring
Dr. Henry Jekyll in Van Helsing
Bus Driver in Billy Madison

References

External links

1952 births
2010 deaths
Deaths from cancer in Lazio
Italian male film actors
Italian male stage actors
Italian male television actors
Italian male video game actors
Italian male voice actors
Italian theatre directors
People from Perugia
20th-century Italian male actors
21st-century Italian male actors